Gnophos dumetata, the Irish annulet,  is a species of moth in the  family Geometridae. It is found in large parts of Europe (including  West Russia and Ukraine), except Great Britain, Portugal, the Benelux, Switzerland, Bulgaria, Fennoscandia and the Baltic region. It is also found from north-western Africa to Armenia, Dagestan, and the south-western part of the former Soviet Union.

The wingspan is 24–28 mm. The upperside of the wings is light chocolate-brown, slightly tending to yellow. The outer marginal area is darker brown. "Larger than stevenaria (Gnopharmia stevenaria), more brownish, with less enlarged costal spots, upperside usually with conspicuous discal dots, that of the forewing sometimes lost in the median shade. Underside without darkened distal area, postmedian line usually indicated by vein-dots."

Adults are on wing in August.

The larvae feed on buckthorn leaves.

Subspecies
Gnophos dumetata dumetata
Gnophos dumetata daubearia (Boisduval, 1840)
Gnophos dumetata hibernica (Forder, 1993) (Ireland)
Gnophos dumetata margaritatus (Zerny, 1927)

References

External links
Irish annulet (Gnophos dumetata hibernica) on UKmoths

Moths described in 1827
Ennominae
Moths of Europe
Taxa named by Georg Friedrich Treitschke